(also known as , or Cape Ryūgū) is the most southern headland on the Satsuma Peninsula at the entrance to Kagoshima Bay. The cape has a lighthouse, is the location of a statue of Urashima Tarō, the fisherman in a Japanese fairy tale, and the Ryūgū Shrine.

Geology

The cape is volcanic in origin and is at the southern border of the Ibusuki Volcanic Field.

Tourism

There are views from the cape, which is easy to access by car, or train, of both Mount Kaimon and the Satsuma Peninsula and nearby are local botanical and zoological gardens.

References

Nagasakibana
Landforms of Kagoshima Prefecture
Extreme points of Japan
Tourist attractions in Kagoshima Prefecture
Ibusuki, Kagoshima